SuWt 2 is a planetary nebula viewed almost edge-on in the constellation of Centaurus. It is believed that high UV radiation from an undiscovered white dwarf ionizes this nebula. Currently, there is a binary system consisting of two A-type main-sequence stars whose radiation is not sufficient to photo-ionize the surrounding nebula. The nebula is easily obscured by the brighter star, HD 121228.

It has been suggested that it has a triple stellar system. One of them, which is more massive than other two A-type main-sequence stars, evolved rapidly and became a red giant, swallowing the other two stars, and produced the planetary nebula.

References

Planetary nebulae
Centaurus (constellation)